Giovanni Padrón (born 15 April 1998) is a Puerto Rican footballer who plays for the Puerto Rican national team.

He debuted internationally on 15 October 2019, and scored his first goal for Puerto Rico against Anguilla in a 3–2 victory in the CONCACAF Nations League.

International goals
Scores and results list Puerto Rico's goal tally first.

References

External links
 
 
 

1998 births
Living people
Puerto Rican footballers
Puerto Rico international footballers
Association football midfielders
United Premier Soccer League players
Sportspeople from Nashville, Tennessee
Soccer players from Tennessee